Religious hierarchy may refer to:

Hierarchical organization, hierarchical structure as applied to all organizations, including some religions
Religious stratification, the stratification of society based on religious beliefs or other faith-based considerations

See also
Hierarchy